FC Hansa Rostock is a German association football club based in the city of Rostock, Mecklenburg-Vorpommern. The club is also called as "the cog" because of its club crest. They have emerged as one of the most successful clubs from the former East Germany after German reunification and have made several appearances in the top-flight Bundesliga. With 21,416 club members, the club is one of the largest sports clubs in Germany.

After being in the Bundesliga for ten years, from 1995 to 2005, Rostock suffered a steady decline. In 2012, the club was relegated to the 3. Liga for the second time and only managed to regain its place in the 2. Bundesliga in 2021.

History
 
The club was originally founded on 1 November 1954 as the multi-sport sports club SC Empor Rostock. The football squad, however, could not be recruited from local enterprise sports communities (BSG) like the squad of the handball section, so a transfer of BSG Empor Lauter's squad from Lauter to Rostock was considered. The area around Lauter, near the Czech border, was well represented in East German football by competitive sides including Wismut Aue, Fortschritt Meerane and Motor Zwickau, so the footballers of BSG Empor Lauter was delegated to Rostock, over the futile protests of the team's local supporters, to Rostock. Then SED First Secretary in Bezirk Rostock Karl Mewis and  SED functionary Harry Tisch were instrumental in the relocation of BSG Empor Lauter to Rostock. Karl Lewis was allegedly the initiator of the relocation. This was not an uncommon occurrence in the 1950s of East German football, where clubs were regularly renamed, re-structured, dismantled or shuffled from city to city at the direction of well-placed communist officials. The new club would be sponsored by the fishing combine VEB Fischkombinat Rostock. 

The wholesale transfer of the Lauterers to Rostock part way through the 1954–55 season led to the disappearance of that association from play. A new club was formed in 1956 as BSG Motor Lauter and on 1 August 1990, it took up the tradition of the original side to play as Lauterer Sportverein Viktoria 1913.

Play in Rostock

Newly formed SC Empor Rostock took the place of the former Lauter-based club in first division play in November 1954. They finished second the next season, but in 1956 plunged to 14th place and were relegated. They quickly bounced back, rejoining the DDR-Oberliga in 1958, before going on to become a very competitive side with a series of three vice-championships to their credit from 1962 to 1964, as well as several appearances in the final of the FDGB Pokal. The re-organization of East German sports in 1965 led to the association's football department becoming independent as Fußball Club Hansa Rostock, which was designated as one of the country's 11 dedicated football club intended to groom talent for the development of a strong East Germany national team. The new club's name acknowledged Rostock's history as one of the major trading centres of northern Europe's Hanseatic League. FC Hansa Rostock would be sponsored by the maritime combine VEB Kombinat Seeverkehr und Hafenwirtschaft. And the club would be patronaged by the SED First Secretary of Bezirk Rostock as well as future Free German Trade Union Federation chairman and Politburo member Harry Tisch. 

By the 1970s, the club was consistently finishing in the lower half of the league table and was relegated to the second division DDR-Liga for a single season on three occasions late in the decade. They returned to form in the 1980s and as the football leagues of West Germany and East Germany were merged in 1990 after the re-unification of the country, Rostock won its first national championship in the final season of East German football, played out in the transitional NOFV-Oberliga. This is their only top flight title to date in play in East Germany or the unified Germany.

They also captured the last East German Cup with a 1–0 win over FC Stahl Eisenhüttenstadt.

United Germany and the Bundesliga

The club's timely success earned them a place in the Bundesliga alongside Dynamo Dresden when the top-flight Bundesliga was briefly expanded from 18 to 20 teams for the 1991–92 season to accommodate two former East German teams. Hansa, however, was unable to stay up and was relegated after falling just a single point shy of SG Wattenscheid 09. Three seasons of tempering in the 2. Bundesliga would return the club to the top flight for the 1995–96 season. In ten years spent in the Bundesliga, the team's best results were a pair of sixth-place finishes. In spite of frequent placings in the bottom-half of the league table, they would persist as the only former East German side able to consistently challenge the well-heeled clubs of the west. On 1 December 2002, Rostock became the first club to field six foreigners from the same country in a Bundesliga match (Rade Prica, Marcus Lantz, Peter Wibrån, Andreas Jakobsson, Magnus Arvidsson and Joakim Persson – all Swedes).

Hansa had a very poor first half in the 2004–05 season, earning only 1 win and 5 draws in 17 matches. They were unable to recover despite the late arrival of Finnish striker Jari Litmanen and at season's end were relegated, leaving the former GDR without a club in the top flight for the first time since re-unification. Like other East German teams, they were the victims of a harsh economic reality as the wealthier, well-established western sides bought up the most talented eastern footballers as their clubs struggled to survive financially: Rostock's Stefan Beinlich, Oliver Neuville and Victor Agali were just three players sent west in exchange for cash. After two years in the 2. Bundesliga, the club returned to the top-flight for the 2007–08 season, but was again relegated.

The club's poor form continued in 2009–10 and they finished third-last. With this season, a new promotion/relegation format accompanied the introduction of the 3. Liga and Rostock found itself in a playoff versus the third place third division club FC Ingolstadt. Hansa lost both legs of the contest and was sent down to the 3. Liga, while Ingolstadt won promotion to the 2. Bundesliga alongside the top two third tier teams which advanced automatically by virtue of their finishes. Their stay was a short one as they were sent back down after finishing bottom table in 2011–12.

Hansa Rostock drew an average home attendance of 11,433 in the 2016–17 3. Liga, the third-highest in the league.

Recent seasons

Honours
After German reunification, the last regular DDR-Oberliga season was played in NOFV-Oberliga. During 1990–91 NOFV-Oberliga season, Hansa Rostock became the last East Germany champion.

Domestic
 NOFV-Oberliga
 Champions: 1991
 DDR-Oberliga
 Runners-up: 1955, 1962, 1963, 1964, 1968
 FDGB-Pokal
 Winners: 1991
 Runners-up: 1955, 1957, 1960, 1967, 1987
 2. Bundesliga
 Champions: 1995
 3. Liga
 Runners-up: 2021

Regional
 Mecklenburg-Vorpommern Cup (Tiers 3–7)
 Winners: 1998, 2005, 2006, 2011, 2015, 2016, 2017, 2018, 2019, 2020

Youth
 German Under 19 championship
 Winner: 2010
 Runners-up: 2013
 German Under 17 championship
 Runners-up: 2005

Other
 German Indoor championship
 Winners: 1998

Double
DDR-Oberliga and FDGB-Pokal:
1991

Players

Current squad

Out on loan

Managers

Fans
A study published in 2007 by Sportfive reported Hansa's fanbase to be the seventh largest in Germany, involving up to two million supporters. According to another study published in 2008 by Allensbach Institute, Hansa is the most popular German football club in the New Länder and the most popular club of the former GDR in reunited Germany. Hansa Rostock's official anthem is "FC Hansa, wir lieben Dich total" ("Hansa FC, We Totally Love You"), recorded in 1995 by East German band Puhdys. Hansa struggles with hooliganism, estimating up to 500 supporters to be leaning towards violence. The club itself as well some fans' associations are anxious to curtail these in several ways. In 2005, the club successfully sued three streakers who disrupted their 2003 match against Hertha BSC to recoup the €20,000 they were fined by the German Football Association (DFB) for failing to maintain adequate security at their ground.

Stadium
The original Ostseestadion was built in 1954, with the participation of several hundred citizens of Rostock who helped for free. The first international match in the Ostseestadion of East Germany was on 26 September 1956. In 2001, the stadium was refurbished and modified to accommodate 30,000 spectators.

Reserve team
The club's reserve team, F.C. Hansa Rostock II, has played as high as Regionalliga level, last playing in the Regionalliga Nord in 2009–10. The team currently plays in the tier five NOFV-Oberliga Nord. It first reached Oberliga level in 1992 and has won three league championships at this level, in 2000, 2005 and 2012.

In 1998, 2005 and 2006, it also won the Mecklenburg-Vorpommern Cup, the local cup competition in Mecklenburg-Vorpommern, and qualified for the first round of the DFB-Pokal through this but never advanced past the first round.

Further reading
 Pönig, Uwe: FC Hansa. Berichte, Statistiken 1966–1966. (german) Ostsee-Druck, Rostock 1969.
 Pönig/Liebenthron: FC Hansa. Alles über den Rostocker Fußballklub in Wort und Bild. (german) Ostsee-Druck, Rostock 1972.
 Baingo, Andreas: FC Hansa Rostock. Wir lieben Dich total! (german) Sportverlag, Berlin 1995, ISBN 3-328-00692-3.
 Rosentreter, Robert: FC Hansa Rostock. Fußball an der Ostsee; im Zeichen der roten Kogge. (german) Suum Cuique, Reutlingen 1995, ISBN 3-927292-55-9.
 Dalk, Wolfgang: Das Fan-Buch Hansa. (german) Weymann Bauer, Rostock 1997, ISBN 3-929395-29-0.
 Krüger, Uwe: Hansa Rostock. Daten, Fakten, Bilder. (german) Agon Sportverlag, Kassel 1998, ISBN 3-89609-127-1.
 Hesselmann/Rosentritt: Hansa Rostock. Der Osten lebt. (german) Die Werkstatt, Göttingen 1999, ISBN 3-89533-258-5.
 Rosentreter/Simon: Immer hart am Wind. 40 Jahre F.C. Hansa Rostock. (german) Die Werkstatt, Göttingen 2005, ISBN 3-89533-504-5.
 Schmidtke, Holger: Stadt- und Regionalentwicklung in strukturschwachem Raum: Welche Bedeutung nimmt der Fußballbundesligist FC Hansa Rostock e.V. ein? (german) AV Akademikerverlag, Saarbrücken 2012, ISBN 3-63942-330-5.
 Achenbach, Björn: Hansa ist mein Leben: 50 Jahre F.C.Hansa Rostock. (german) Hinstorff, Rostock 2014, ISBN 978-3-356-01867-7.
 Neubert, Heiko: Fankogge: Mit Hansa durch die DDR-Oberliga. (german) nofb-shop.de, Berlin 2014, ISBN 978-3-00-044931-4.
 Brown, Kieran: 111 Gründe, Hansa Rostock zu lieben. (german) Schwarzkopf Schwarzkopf, Berlin 2014, ISBN 978-3-86265-416-1.
 Schwinkendorf, Andreas: Fußball und Gewalt. Die Sicht von Zuschauern und Akteuren am Beispiel des F. C. Hansa Rostock. (german) Verlag für Polizeiwissenschaft, Rostock/Bochum 2014, ISBN 978-3-86676-377-7.
 Bertram, Marco: F.C. Hansa Rostock. Fußballfibel. (german) CULTURCON medien, Berlin 2016, ISBN 978-3-944068-50-3.
 Neubert, Heiko: Fankogge 2: Allein gegen den Westen. (german) Eigenverlag, Rostock 2018, ISBN 978-1-72898-984-6.
 Bertram, Marco (editor): Kaperfahrten: Mit der Kogge durch stürmische See. (german) nofb-shop.de, Berlin 2020, ISBN 978-3-00-066536-3.
 Czoch, Peter: Alles für den FCH! Die legendärsten Hansa-Spiele. (german) Die Werkstatt, Göttingen 2021, ISBN 978-3-7307-0536-0.

See also
List of F.C. Hansa Rostock players
F.C. Hansa Rostock statistics

References

External links

Hansanews.de | The online magazine 

 
Football clubs in Germany
Football clubs in East Germany
Football clubs in Mecklenburg-Western Pomerania
Sport in Rostock
Association football clubs established in 1965
1965 establishments in East Germany
Works association football clubs in Germany
Bundesliga clubs
2. Bundesliga clubs
3. Liga clubs
Sports team relocations